Boston University Terriers ice hockey may refer to either of the ice hockey teams that represent Boston University:

Boston University Terriers men's ice hockey
Boston University Terriers women's ice hockey